Winston Craig (born July 25, 1995) is a former American football defensive end. He played college football at Richmond.

College career
Over the course of his college career with the Spiders, Craig appeared in 52 games and recorded 166 tackles, 20.5 tackles for loss, 13.5 sacks and two interceptions.

Professional career

Philadelphia Eagles
After going undrafted in the 2017 NFL Draft, Craig signed with the Philadelphia Eagles on May 11, 2017. On September 1, 2017, he was waived by the Eagles. He was signed to their practice squad on December 7, 2017, after Justin Hamilton signed with the Kansas City Chiefs.  He was waived again on January 9, 2018, to make room for Harold Jones-Quartey. As a result, he was not part of the Eagles when they won the Super Bowl. Craig was re-signed to the Eagles on February 20, 2018.

On September 1, 2018, Craig was waived by the Eagles and was signed to the practice squad the next day. He was released on September 7, 2018. He was re-signed to the practice squad on October 16, 2018. Craig was released by the Eagles on November 2, 2018.

San Antonio Commanders
In December 2018, Craig signed with the San Antonio Commanders of the AAF.

Pittsburgh Steelers
After the AAF suspended football operations, Craig signed with the Pittsburgh Steelers on April 8, 2019. He was waived on August 31, 2019.

Dallas Renegades
Craig was selected by the Dallas Renegades in the 2020 XFL Draft. He had his contract terminated when the league suspended operations on April 10, 2020.

References

External links
Richmond Spiders bio

1995 births
Living people
Players of American football from North Carolina
People from Jamestown, North Carolina
American football defensive tackles
Richmond Spiders football players
Philadelphia Eagles players
San Antonio Commanders players
Pittsburgh Steelers players
Dallas Renegades players